The Debtors' Prison in Tappahannock, Virginia, is a historic debtors' prison dating back to the 18th century.  Constructed sometime before 1769, it is one of three such structures remaining in Virginia, along with those in Accomac and Worsham.  The prison building is a contributing structure to the Tappahannock Historic District, and as such was listed on the National Register of Historic Places in 1973.

History
The exact date of construction for the old debtors' prison is not known, but a court order from 1769 shows it as being surrounded by "prison bounds", indicating that the structure had most likely already been built and was in use by that date.  Its existence is noted in another court order, dating to 1809, that separated criminal and debtor prison populations into different facilities. A town plat drawn up in 1850 shows it at its present location, on the courthouse green, along with four other jails.  Little else is known about its history, save that it was most likely converted to other uses when the state of Virginia abandoned the use of imprisonment as a punishment for debt in 1849.  Unlike similar buildings elsewhere in Virginia, the jail is still owned by the county government, which currently uses it as the county treasurer's office.

Design
The prison building is simple in design, being made of Flemish bond brick and having three bays in front.  The entry door is at the center of the front face of the structure, and has a well-worn sandstone sill at its foot. There is a more modern addition on the rear of the building.  The prison's floor plan is almost square, and it is one-and-one-half stories tall.

Significance
The Debtors' Prison is part of a compact block of historic structures, located in central Tappahannock and bounded by Church Lane, Queen's Street, Cross Street, and Prince Street, which together trace the town's political and maritime history.  With the Old Clerk's Office, the Old Essex County Courthouse, and the New Essex County Courthouse, it forms the town's "most convincing case for architectural history".  The four also serve to show the marked similarity of design often seen in county court facilities in the area.

References

National Register of Historic Places in Essex County, Virginia
Defunct prisons in Virginia
Debtors' prisons
Essex County, Virginia
Government buildings completed in the 18th century
Government buildings on the National Register of Historic Places in Virginia
Prisons on the National Register of Historic Places
Historic district contributing properties in Virginia